The 1900 North Carolina Tar Heels football team represented the University of North Carolina in the 1900 Southern Intercollegiate Athletic Association football season.  They played eight games with a final record of 4–1–3 (3-0-1 in the SIAA). The team captain for the 1900 season was Frank M. Osborne.

Schedule

Players

Line

Backfield

Subs

References

North Carolina
North Carolina Tar Heels football seasons
North Carolina Tar Heels football